The second pledge at al-Aqabah was an important event in the mission of the Islamic prophet Muhammad where 75 residents of the city of Medina pledged their loyalty to Muhammad as their leader in an agreement known as a bay'ah. It preceded the Hijrah, or migration of Muhammad and his supporters to Medina where Muhammad became ruler, from Mecca where they were persecuted. The pledge occurred in 622 CE at a mountain pass (al-Aqabah) five kilometers from Mecca.

Event
Converts to Islam came from both non-Jewish Arab tribes present in Medina, such that by June of the subsequent year there were seventy-five Muslims coming to Mecca for pilgrimage and to meet Muhammad. Meeting him secretly by night, the group made what was known as the "Second Pledge of al-`Aqaba", or "The Second Pledge of Mount Aqabah" where the pledge was made. The guarantee of protection led Orientalists and Muslim scholars to describe it as "Pledge of War". Conditions of the pledge, many of which similar to the first, included obedience to Muhammad, "enjoining good and forbidding evil" as well as responding to the call to arms when required.

The Muslim scholar Shawqī Abū Khalīl says that the pledge states:

List
A list of those included:
Abu Umamah
Nusaybah bint Ka'ab, from the Banu Najjar

From Banu Khazraj:
`Abd Allah ibn Rawahah
Sa'd ibn Ubadah
As‘ad bin Zurarah bin ‘Ads
Sa‘d bin Ar-Rabi‘ bin ‘Amr
Rafi‘ bin Malik bin Al-‘Ajlan
Al-Bara’ bin Ma‘rur bin Sakhr
‘Abdullah bin ‘Amr bin Haram
‘Ubadah bin As-Samit bin Qais
Al-Mundhir bin ‘Amr bin Khunais

From Banu Aws:
Usaid bin Hudair bin Sammak...
Sa‘d bin Khaithamah bin Al-Harith
Rifa‘a bin ‘Abdul Mundhir bin Zubair

Arranging the meeting
The oft-repeated question amongst them was "Isn’t it high time we protect Muhammad instead of leaving him forsaken, deserted and stumbling in the hillocks of Makkah?"

Shortly after arriving to Mecca, they secretly contacted Muhammad and decided to have a meeting at night in mid Tashreeq Days on last year's meeting place.

Pledge

In another version:

Muhammad took the pledge of the two women – Nusaybah bint Ka'ab and Umm Munee Asma bint Amr bin 'Ad – orally, rather than clasping hands with them, considering that they were not Mahram with him.

Deputies
Muhammad asked those involved to appoint twelve deputies to preach Islam in Medina and taking responsibility in matters relating to the propagation of Islam regarding the people of their own tribe. Those elected were:

From Banu Khazraj:
`Abd Allah ibn Rawahah
Sa'd ibn Ubadah
As‘ad bin Zurarah bin ‘Ads
Sa‘d bin Ar-Rabi‘ bin ‘Amr
Rafi‘ bin Malik bin Al-‘Ajlan
Al-Bara’ bin Ma‘rur bin Sakhr
‘Abdullah bin ‘Amr bin Haram
‘Ubadah bin As-Samit bin Qais
Al-Mundhir bin ‘Amr bin Khunais

From Banu Aws:
Usaid bin Hudair bin Sammak
Sa‘d bin Khaithamah bin Al-Harith
Rifa‘a bin ‘Abdul Mundhir bin Zubair

Once again, those twelve men were sworn to act as surety over the affairs of their people, and Muhammad would act as surety over his people, meaning all the Muslims.

At this point, the secret meeting was discovered by an inhabitant in Al-‘Aqabah. Al-‘Abbas bin Nadlah said "By Allâh, Who has sent you in Truth, we are powerful enough to put the people of Mina (the Quraishites) to our swords tomorrow, if you desire."  Muhammad said "We have not been commanded to follow that course. Now, back to your camps." They went back to sleep until morning.

Meccan protests
The following day, a large delegation that included the Meccan leaders set out for the camp of the Medinan to protest severely against the treaty: "O people of Khazraj, it transpired to us that you have come here to conclude a treaty with this man and evacuate him out of Makkah.  By Allâh, we do really hold in abhorrence any sort of fight between you and us."

The Medinan polytheists were not aware of the secret meeting and swore by God that no truth in the report. ‘Abdullah bin Ubai bin Salul, a Medinan polytheist, refuted their allegations denouncing them as null and void, claiming that his people would never initiate anything unless he gave them clear orders.

The Medinan Muslims did not speak and the Meccans became convinced by the arguments of the Medinan polytheist. However, they were not fully satisfied and kept investigating the matter.  It was not after that the Medinan pilgrims had left the city that they realized the truth of the matter. In a fit of rage, they pursued the pilgrims.

After much effort, they arrested al-Mundhir bin Amru but he broke away from them. Sa'd ibn Ubadah was also captured.  They tied his hands to his neck and dragged him by his hair. Heavily beating him, they brought him to Mecca.  But, luckily, Al-Mut‘im bin ‘Adi and Harith ibn Harb saved him, due to business relation they had with him.

See also
List of notable Muslim records and milestones during Muhammad's era

Notes

References

Treaties of Muhammad